The 3rd V Chart Awards (第三届音悦V榜年度盛典) is a music awards hosted by YinYueTai on April 11, 2015 at Cadillac Arena, Beijing. The emcee for the award were Li Chen, Zhang Yu'an and Zhang Xinyue. The awards was broadcast on Shenzhen Television.

Shortlisted Criteria 
1. The "data-based category" award nominees are artists who released an official MV in between January 1, 2015 to December 31, 2015 and the artist must be ranked in the chart throughout the whole year.

2. "The Most Popular Artists" series of shortlisted nominees are the top 30 artists in the TOP100 list in all five regions.

3. "Artist Award" series nominees are artists who released music-related work(s) in between January 2015 to December 31, 2015. In addition to the results of the MV chart, the awards will be based on a combination of criteria: the standard of the released album, participation in offline activities, performances, film and television, hosting and the results that accompanies.

4. "Composition Category" award nominees are artists who released an official MV from January 1, 2015 to December 31, 2015 and the artist must have the most #1 wins in the chart throughout the whole year. "MV Awards" are based on MV production standards, word of mouth, shooting, conception, production and list of achievements to determine the winning entries.

5. "Album of The Year" is determined according to the annual album sales data ranking on the Yin Yue Shopping Mall 2015. Shortlisted nominees are the top 10 albums on the data ranking.

Personnel

Host 
YinYueTai

Official Broadcasting Site 
StarTV YinYueTai

Data provider 
YinYueTai Mobile App, YinYueTai PC App, YinYueTai Official Website, Baidu

Interworking Partners 
Billboard, Gaon Charts

Collaboration Partners 
Hunan Broadcasting System, Dragon TV, Sohu TV, KpopStars, Baidu, Miaopai by MeituPic and more.

Voting 
On March 4, 2015, The 3rd V Chart Awards was officially launched. On March 5, nominees for the "Favourite Artist of the Year" were announced. On the 9th, the first phase of the "Favourite Artist of the Year" series of polls began and voting ended on the 20th. A complete list of the winners was published on the official website on the subsequent day (March 12) of the award ceremony (March 11).

Winners and nominees 

All winners and nominees are sourced from the organization's official website.

External links 
Homepage

References 

2015 music awards
Events in Beijing
V Chart Awards
2015 in Chinese music
April 2015 events in China